"Hyperballad" (sometimes written as "Hyper-Ballad") is a song by Icelandic musician and recording artist Björk, released as the fourth single from her second solo album, Post (1995). The song was written by Björk and co-produced by long time collaborator Nellee Hooper. It infuses folktronica, acid house and synth-pop. The lyrical content discusses a dream that Björk experienced, in which she wakes early before her lover and throws small objects off a cliff, watching them smash. She imagines her body in their place, which makes her feel better about returning to her safe home and the arms of her lover. 

"Hyperballad" was heavily lauded by contemporary music critics, who stated that it was the best song of Björk's career. The song's lyrical content, vocal performance and experimentation in its production and composition were also highly praised. The song was moderately successful in the countries it charted in, including Finland, Australia, United States, Sweden and the United Kingdom (where it was the last of three top ten hits, after "Army of Me" and "It's Oh So Quiet"). A music video was released for the single, featuring a digitalised Björk running and falling from a cliff. Björk performed the song at the 1997 Tibetan Freedom Concert in New York, which was recorded by Sylvia Massy for Capitol Records. This live version was subsequently included on the second disc of the Tibetan Freedom Concert album released later that year.

Composition

Production and musical influence
"Hyperballad" was written by Björk and co-produced by her and Nellee Hooper, who had contributed to other Björk albums. The chords and lyrics in the verses move in three bar phrases; the choruses are in four bar phrases. It combines a house beat with a string section conducted by Brazilian musician Eumir Deodato. Heather Phares from AllMusic compared the song to the work of Aphex Twin.

Lorraine Ali from Rolling Stone said that Björk "turns fantasy into morbid but honest wonderment for 'Hyperballad.' Here's what she sings over a sweeping, panoramic vista: 'I imagine what my body would sound like slamming against the rocks, and when it lands, will my eyes be closed or open?'"

Lyrical content

In the lyrics, Björk describes living at the top of a mountain and going to a cliff at sunrise. She throws objects off while pondering her own suicide. The ritual allows her to exorcise darker thoughts and return to her partner. Björk stated that "I feel that words can have a mysticism or a hidden meaning. On Hyperballad, the idea that I'm throwing car parts from a cliff is about getting out my frustrations."

Björk explains: "I guess that song is about when you're in a relationship and it's going really well and you're really happy and maybe you have given up parts of yourself. To fall in love and be in a relationship for a long time is like giving a lot of parts of you away because the relationship becomes more important than you as individuals. It's a bit of a tricky balance. I think everyone in a relationship needs to know not to forget themselves..." (from an interview by David Hemingway)

She also explained how the song relates to the hiding of an aggressive part of oneself from a lover.

Critical reception
"Hyperballad" was heavily acclaimed from music critics. Glenn Swan from AllMusic gave it a separate review, and awarded it 4 stars out of five, making it Björk's highest viewed single on the website. Mike Diver from BBC Music said "Hyper-Ballad – single four of six taken from this 11-tracker – is similarly striking, and remains among the very finest songs in Björk’s canon [...] perfectly is an indelibly excellent example of music meeting art. It’s a benchmark of successful audio-visual synergy." Steve Baltin from Cash Box named it Pick of the Week, noting that it "glistens with the dazzling light heartedness that characterizes the critically-hailed Post collection." He added, "With disco undercurrents beneath the strong pop grooves, "Hyper-Ballad" is a delightful track that all fans of quality music will enjoy. [...] Don’t be surprised if this song becomes a club hit." Chuck Campbell from Knoxville News Sentinel found that the "humming, low-slung" track "is much darker as Bjork reveals an early morning ritual of throwing objects from a cliff and imagines taking the plunge herself." James Hyman from Music Weeks RM Dance Update rated it 5 stars out of five, adding, "From day one, Bjork embraced dance culture, realising its importance in running parallel to the commercial release. 'Hyperballad' is icing on that cake". Another editor, James Hamilton, noted its "winsome caterwauling quirkiness". Also Eric Henderson from Slant Magazine was favorable, saying, "Without missing a beat, Björk puts herself into the role of fragile suicidist on "Hyper-Ballad," as she throws tchotchkes over a cliff to approximate the nature of her own plunge. A phenomenal journey, the track begins with lightly shuffling drum n' bass before expanding into an immense house groove."

Drowned In Sound listed it at number #8 on their top ten Björk singles. XFM Radio listed it at number 686 on their The XFM Top 1,000 Songs Of All Time. NME listed the song as the 69th best song of the 1990s, stating that "'Hyperballad' was an earnest attempt to try and make old love alive once more. She said it was about the art of "not forgetting about yourself" in a relationship and this was reflected in the music which altered from gentle folktronica to drum and bass-tinted acid house." Diffuser.fm described the song as "lush, sweeping cinematic synth-pop."

"Hyperballad" was the song receiving most votes from Björk fans on the overall survey for her Greatest Hits album's song list. In September 2010, Pitchfork included the song at number #2 on their "Top 200 Tracks of the 90s", behind only Mariah Carey's "Fantasy (Bad Boy Remix)".

Music video

The accompanying music video for "Hyperballad" was directed by Michel Gondry. It features Björk as a video game character who runs through an obscure, two-dimensional landscape of pylons before throwing herself off a cliff. This sequence, along with several others (including blinking lights and some of herself performing the song), are projected onto a three-dimensional shot of Björk lying amongst a mountainous landscape.

The video was filmed at Telecine Cell in London, using a motion control system. The entire video and all the effects were shot on a single 400 ft roll of film, by multiple exposure and frame-accurate backwinding of the film strip. The graphics were shot as a series of secondary exposures using a television monitor, and the flashing lights were created with an LED strip board, also exposed on the same piece of film. At Gondry's insistence, no edits were made after the film was exposed; the only post processing consisted of colour correction during transfer of the piece to videotape.

Björk sings live in the video. This new vocal take was later featured in the CD2 of the "Hyperballad" single, and in the 5.1 edition of Surrounded. Mike Diver from BBC Music gave it a positive review, saying "its accompanying video is a masterstroke of suggestive simplicity, evocative elegance; that it suits its skittering beats and contorting vocal [...]"

Reception
Music writer Carol Vernallis felt Gondry developed texture with an aesthetic that does not become "too coy or sickly sweet" by incorporating "a whiff of death"; pointing out that in the video, "Björk's head resembles a death mask". A reviewer, D File, wrote: "Due partially to my personal puzzlement in understanding this video and the construction of its imagery, I’ve concluded that 'Hyperballad' is, if nothing else, one of the most avant-garde pieces of music video in the late 20th century. At one glance, the composites completely coalesce with the elements of the song. Yet the imagery is so transcendent of any other pop promo. Upside, inside out."

Henry Keazor and Thorsten Wübbena considered that the clip "[has] taught us that electronic bodies are rather intangible, dematerialized, purer in a certain way." The music video, with its play on the boundaries between real and virtual, has been absorbed by club culture, as a representative of the scene's visual forms of expression.

Rick Poynor wrote that the video showcases "[Björk's commitment] to a 'techno' sensibility". Gondry and Björk—who have worked together continuously—"shared delight in playing interpretative games with her visual identity." He also said that the video demonstrated the musician's "[embrace of] the computer's shape-shifting powers."

Track listing
These are the formats and track listings of major single releases of "Hyperballad".European CD single #1"Hyperballad" (Radio Edit) – 3:58
"Cover Me" (Plaid Mix) – 5:24European CD single #2 /Australian/Japanese/Mexican CD single"Hyperballad" (Radio Edit) – 4:01
"Hyperballad" (Robin Hood Riding Through the Glen Remix) – 6:31
"Hyperballad" (Disco Sync Mix) – 4:24
"Hyperballad" (Subtle Abuse Mix) – 6:54UK Cassette single"Hyperballad" (Radio Edit) – 4:00
"Hyperballad" (Robin Hood Riding Through the Glen Mix) – 6:32UK CD single #1 / digital download #1"Hyperballad" (Radio Edit) – 4:00
"Hyperballad" (Robin Hood Riding Through the Glen Remix) – 6:32
"Hyperballad" (The Stomp Mix) – 5:09
"Hyperballad" (The Hyperballad Fluke Mix) – 6:38
"Hyperballad" (Subtle Abuse Mix) – 6:56
"Hyperballad" (Tee's Freeze Mix) – 7:19UK CD single #2 / digital download #2"Hyperballad" (Radio Edit) – 3:58
"Isobel" (The Carcass Remix) – 5:41
"Cover Me" (Plaid Mix) – 5:24
"Hyperballad" (Towa Tei Remix) – 8:12US CD single"Hyperballad" (Radio Edit) – 3:58
"Hyperballad" (Robin Hood Riding Through the Glen Mix) – 6:29
"Hyperballad" (Subtle Abuse Mix) – 6:53
"Hyperballad" (Tee's Freeze Mix) – 7:19
"Hyperballad" (David Morales Classic Mix) – 9:10
"Hyperballad" (Towa Tei Choice Mix) – 8:13US 12" single'''
"Hyperballad" (David Morales Classic Mix) – 9:09
"Hyperballad" (Tee's Freeze Mix) – 7:18
"Hyperballad" (Disco Sync Mix) – 4:20
"Hyperballad" (Subtle Abuse Mix) – 6:53

Official versions

Album version
Brodsky Quartet version
David Morales Boss Dub mix
David Morales Classic mix
David Morales radio edit
Disco Sync mix
Fluke mix
Girls Blouse mix
LFO 3.A.M mix
Over the Edge mix
Radio edit (edit of album version)
Radio edit (video version)
Robin Hood Riding Through the Glen mix
Subtle Abuse mix
Tee's Freeze mix
The Stomp mix
Tom Apella remix
Towa Tei remix/Towa Tei Choice mix

Note: UK CD 1 and 2 both include a mix labelled "radio edit," however the mix on CD 1 is an edit of the album version, while CD 2 features newly recorded vocals taken from the video.

Charts

Covers
The song has been covered by many artists. Yeah Yeah Yeahs, The Ladybird Sideshow, and Glen Phillips covered it during their live shows. Peruvian band Ni Voz Ni Voto covered it for their Unplugged Album Acustico 2002, Greg Dulli and his band The Twilight Singers covered it in their album of 2004, She Loves You.

John Nolan covered this song at Kevin Devine's Record Release Party in 2005. Big Heavy Stuff covers this song on Like a Version, a compilation album by the Australian radio station Triple J. Tori Amos covered parts of this song as an intro or bridge to Butterfly. She also covered a full version on her "Summer of Sin" tour.

Brodsky Quartet contributed their talents to a remix of the song, which first appeared on Björk's Post album, and later on Telegram. The song is mistitled "Hyperballad (Brodski Quartet Version)" on all pressings of the limited two CD edition Australian of Post.

Indonesian band Mocca covered this song on their album of 2007, Colours. The same year also saw an Australian collaboration album named No Man's Woman, featured male vocalists covering some of the most famous songs performed by women. Folk singer Whitley delivered an arrangement of Hyperballad for this project. In 2008, the Spanish group Celtas Cortos made a cover of it in their album 40 de abril, under the title of "Abismo" (meaning "Cliff"). Dirty Projectors also covered the song on Enjoyed: A Tribute to Björk's Post.

Japanese singer-songwriter UA covered Hyperballad on her 2010 album KABA.

In 2010, Robyn performed a cover of the song at the Polar Music Prize ceremony, when Björk and Ennio Morricone were awarded the prize. In jazz, the song has been covered by Marcin Wasilewski, Slawomir Kurkiewicz, and Michal Miskiewicz on their album of 2004, Trio, and by the Verneri Pohjola Quartet on the album of 2012 Ancient History.

British singer Matt Fishel recorded a choral a cappella cover of the song. After receiving numerous requests from his fans to release it officially after he originally uploaded it to his MySpace page in the mid 2000s, Fishel's cover was eventually released on his 2014 covers EP Cover Boy.Stump, Howard. "Matt Fishel * Cover Boy" , Soundtrack To My Day, United States, 16 July 2014. Retrieved on 29 July 2014.
In July 2014, Tori Amos covered the song on her Unrepentant Geraldines Tour''.

References

External links
 Hyperballad webpage
 Official Björk discography

Björk songs
Music videos directed by Michel Gondry
1996 singles
Songs written by Björk
Songs written by Marius de Vries
Songs written by Nellee Hooper
Song recordings produced by Nellee Hooper
Song recordings produced by Björk
House music songs
Songs about suicide
1995 songs